Gregory Todd Farshtey (born July 14, 1965) is an American writer, best known for his work on the Bionicle series of novels (2003–2010), the Bionicle comics (2001–2010), and the Ninjago graphic novel series.

Literary career
Gregory Todd Farshtey was born in Mount Kisco, New York, and grew up in nearby Monroe, New York and Stamford, Connecticut.

In high school, Farshtey wrote and edited a weekly satirical newsletter, Lunatic News and World Report. After graduating with a B.A. in communications from the State University of New York at Geneseo,  he worked as a reporter and sports editor before securing an editorial position with West End Games. 

Over the next seven years, he authored or co-authored over 35 roleplaying game books and helped to create the Shatterzone and Bloodshadows roleplaying game universes. He also authored a handful of short stories: the anthologies Dragons Over England (1992), Strange Tales from the Nile Empire (1992), and Shattered and Other Stories (1994); and three novels: The River of God (1992), Hell's Feast (1994), and Demon's Dream (1996).

Farshtey joined the Lego Group in late 2000, writing for the Lego Mania Magazine and the Bionicle comic series. He now writes and edits six editions of the bi-monthly Lego Club Magazine and Lego Club Jr. Magazine.

Farshtey is the author of over 80 books, including novels set in the Bionicle, Exo-Force, and Hero Factory universes, the Ninjago graphic novel series, short stories for Chima, Ninjago, and the Bionicle comic series which has over 2 million readers. His work has been published in English, Russian, Chinese, French, Polish, and German, among other languages. He also wrote the story for the Bionicle DVD movie, Bionicle: The Legend Reborn (2009). He has made numerous public appearances at San Diego Comic-Con, bookstores, and libraries.

Following the LEGO Group's discontinuation of the original Bionicle line of products in 2010, Farshtey first intended to continue the story by writing online stories. However, after the launch of Ninjago, he was unable to complete this project.

Farshtey was the Editorial Director at the Lego Company. On March 1, 2022, Farshtey announced on his LinkedIn account that he would be leaving LEGO in July after working for 22 years at the company.

Farshtey is divorced and lives in Connecticut with his daughter and his cat.

References

External links
Greg Farshtey Article on the BIONICLEsector01 Wiki

Living people
1965 births
21st-century American novelists
21st-century American male writers
American children's writers
American comics writers
American male novelists
American people of Russian descent
American science fiction writers
comic book editors
Role-playing game designers
Lego people
People from Mount Kisco, New York
People from Monroe, New York
State University of New York at Geneseo alumni
Writers from New York (state)
Writers from Stamford, Connecticut